Wangchengpo Subdistrict is a subdistrict of Yuelu District in Changsha, Hunan, China. It was formed in 1998. The subdistrict has 10 communities under its jurisdiction.

Etymology
Wangcheng means to be able to see the city in Chinese, overlooking the city. Po means hill, hillside. Here, the meaning of Wangchengpo refers to the hill that can look at Changsha City. Wangchengpo was historically a hill, and it was named because people could see Changsha City there. In ancient times, it used to be the starting point in Changsha for the ancient courier routes connecting Guizhou and Sichuan, and it had been gathering for thousands of years.

It is worth mentioning that the real Wangchengpo Old Street is in Xidamen Community of Xianjiahu Subdistrict. When Wangcheng County was built in 1951, here was the seat of Wangcheng County, and the county was named after its seat. The seat's location of Wangchengpo Subdistrict is called Kafangling in the past. Also, the location of the current Changsha West Bus Station is called Sanlilong.

History
The subdistrict of Wangchengpo was established in 1998. It was amalgamated by the former two villages of Jiantang and Wangxin from Tianding Township. In April 1999, it was also included in the Hejiawan Villager Group of Yanshan Village in Tianding Township.

Geography
Wangchengpo Subdistrict is located in the middle of Yuelu District, 1.5 kilometers away from Changsha Municipal Government. There are more than 70 provincial and municipal units in its territory including Hunan University of Technology and Commerce, Changsha Meteorological Bureau, Changsha West Bus Station, more than 110 small enterprises and more than 3,000 individual industrial and commercial households. The subdistrict is situated in the core area of Xiangjiang New Area, adjacent to Meixihu International Functional Service Area and Changsha High-Tech Industrial Development Zone.

The transportation in the area is convenient. Changsha West Bus Station is located in it. Changsha Comprehensive Transportation Hub and Wangchengpo Metro Transfer Station are in the center, The main trunk lines of Second Ring Road, Leifeng Avenue, Yuelu Avenue, Jinxing Avenue, Xianjiahu West Road, Fenglin Road and Tongzipo Road constitute the “three vertical and three horizontal” of its traffic lines.

Subdivisions
10 communities
 Changhua Community
 Jiangongshan Community
 Jiantang Community
 Laohuling Community
 Nanjiatang Community
 Shangmaocheng Community
 Wanglu Community
 Wangxin Community
 Xiangyi Community
 Zhumatang Community

External links
 Official Website （Chinese / 中文）

Transport
Wangchengpo station

References

Yuelu District
Subdistricts of Changsha